In the study of the Riemann hypothesis, a Lehmer pair is a pair of zeros of the Riemann zeta function that are unusually close to each other. They are named after Derrick Henry Lehmer, who discovered the pair of zeros

 
(the 6709th and 6710th zeros of the zeta function).

More precisely, a Lehmer pair can be defined as having the property that their complex coordinates  and  obey the inequality

for a constant .

It is an unsolved problem whether there exist infinitely many Lehmer pairs.
If so, it would imply that the De Bruijn–Newman constant is non-negative,
a fact that has been proven unconditionally by Brad Rodgers and Terence Tao.

See also
Montgomery's pair correlation conjecture

References

Analytic number theory